Mad Dog Knives is a custom  knifemaking facility headed by Kevin McClung, a former Senior Materials Scientist at the American Rocket Company, Mad Dog Knives is based in Prescott, Arizona.  Mad Dog Knives made the fixed-blade knife known as the ATAK, used by Naval Special Warfare Groups 1 and 2 after the "SEAL Trials" of 1992.  Mad Dog Knives are typically made from selectively tempered, hand ground O1 Tool Steel with a hardchrome plating to protect the blade.

Materials and design
Mad Dog Knives makes tactical fixed-blade knives, originally using Starrett 496-O1 high carbon tool steel and later switching to Precision Marshall Presco American Made 01, which is given a proprietary heat treatment.  This process includes hardening, stress relieving, and selectively tempering the blade. As a result, the blades have an edge hardness of 62-63 on the Rockwell C scale whereas the tip, spine, and tang have a Rockwell hardness of 50-54. This heat treatment was devised to develop phenomenal edge retention while preventing tip breakage and maintaining a degree of flexibility on the softer spine to improve the toughness of the knife. The blades are coated with a layer of hard chrome as a method of abrasion and corrosion resistance.

Mad Dog Knives utilizes a proprietary glass/epoxy composite material for the handle material of its knives. This material can withstand long term heat in excess of 149 degrees Celsius (300 degrees Fahrenheit), a tractive force of 79,000 psi, current of 1,000 volts per mil (0.001") of thickness and is impervious to salt water, diesel oil, benzine and other caustic/corrosive fluids.  Mad Dog Knives utilizes Kydex 100 ® as a sheath material. 

Mad Dog Knives has made ceramic MIRAGE X blades and blades from other non-metallic materials for EOD and other military usage.  These knives are not available for sale to the general public.

Military models

Mad Dog Knives won the 1992 "SEAL Trials" to supply Naval Special Warfare Groups 1 and 2 with a fixed blade knife.  This knife is the ATAK (Advanced Tactical Assault Knife) and Mad Dog Knives received a U.S. Navy Sole Source Justification for its manufacture. The ATAK is the only knife in US Military history justified as such.

In the media
Mad Dog Knives have been described as weapons in Richard Marcinko's Rogue Warrior novels and were props in Steven Seagal's movie Under Siege 2: Dark Territory.  One of the knives used in the movie was later sold at a Safari Club International fund raiser for $10,000.

References

Knife manufacturing companies